The following is a list of the largest banks in the Americas by total assets as of April 11, 2022. Information from 2022 S&P Global Market Intelligence, and all of the largest banks on the continent are based in two countries – the United States and Canada.

See also
 List of largest banks
 List of largest banks in the United States
 List of largest banks in North America
 List of largest banks in Latin America

References

Banks of the Americas